Open-pit mining, also known as open-cast or open-cut mining and in larger contexts mega-mining, is a surface mining technique of extracting rock or minerals from the earth from an open-air pit, sometimes known as a borrow.

This form of mining differs from extractive methods that require tunnelling into the earth, such as long wall mining. Open-pit mines are used when deposits of commercially useful ore or rocks are found near the surface. It is applied to ore or rocks found at the surface because the overburden is relatively thin or the material of interest is structurally unsuitable for tunnelling (as would be the case for cinder, sand, and gravel). In contrast, minerals that have been found underground but are difficult to retrieve due to hard rock, can be reached using a form of underground mining.

To create an open-pit mine, the miners must determine the information of the ore that is underground. This is done through drilling of probe holes in the ground, then plotting each hole location on a map. The information gained through the holes with provide an idea of the vertical extent of the ore's body. This vertical information is then used to pit tentative locations of the benches that will occur in the mine. It is important to consider the grade and economic value of the ore in the potential pit. Open-pit mines that produce building materials and dimension stone are commonly referred to as "quarries."

Open-pit mines are typically enlarged until either the mineral resource is exhausted, or an increasing ratio of overburden to ore makes further mining uneconomic. When this occurs, the exhausted mines are sometimes converted to landfills for disposal of solid wastes. However, some form of water control is usually required to keep the mine pit from becoming a lake, if the mine is situated in a climate of considerable precipitation or if any layers of the pit forming the mine border productive aquifers. In Germany and adjacent countries several former open pit mines have been deliberately converted into artificial lakes forming areas such as the Lusatian Lake District, the Central German Lake District or the Upper Palatinate Lake District. A particular concern in the formation of these lakes is acid mine drainage.

Open-pit mining is to be considered one of the most dangerous sectors in the industrial world. It causes significant effects to miners' health, as well as damage to the ecological land. Open-pit mining causes changes to vegetation, soil, and bedrock, which ultimately contributes to changes in surface hydrology, groundwater levels, and flow paths. Additionally, open-pit produces harmful pollutants depending on the type of mineral being mined, and the type of mining process being used.

Extraction

Open-cast mines are dug on benches, which describe vertical levels of the hole. The interval of the benches depends on the deposit being mined, the mineral being mined, and the size of the machinery that is being used. Generally, large mine benches are 12 to 15 metres thick. In contrast, many quarries do not use benches, as they are usually shallow. Mining can be conducted on more than one bench at a time, and access to different benches is done with a system of ramps. The width of each bench is determined by the size of the equipment being used, generally 20–40 metres wide. Downward ramps are created to allow mining on a new level to begin. This new level will become progressively wider to form the new pit bottom.

Most walls of the pit are generally mined on an angle less than vertical. Waste rock is stripped when the pit becomes deeper, therefore this angle is a safety precaution to prevent and minimize damage and danger from rock falls. However, this depends on how weathered and eroded the rocks are, and the type of rocks involved. It also depends on the amount of structural weaknesses occur within the rocks, such as a faults, shears, joints or foliations.

The walls are stepped. The inclined section of the wall is known as the batter, and the flat part of the step is known as the bench or berm. The steps in the walls help prevent rock falls continuing down the entire face of the wall. In some instances additional ground support is required and rock bolts, cable bolts and shotcrete are used. De-watering bores may be used to relieve water pressure by drilling horizontally into the wall, which is often enough to cause failures in the wall by itself.

A haul road is usually situated at the side of the pit, forming a ramp up which trucks can drive, carrying ore and waste rock.

Waste
Open-pit mines create a significant amount of waste. Almost one million tons of ore and waste rock can move from the largest mines per day, and a couple thousand tons moved from small mines per day. There is generally four main operations in a mine that contribute to this load: drilling, blasting, loading, and hauling.

Waste rock is hauled to a waste dump. Waste dumps can be piled at the surface of the active pit, or in previously mined pits.

Leftover waste from processing the ore is called tailings, and is generally in the form of a slurry. This is pumped to a tailings dam or settling pond, where the water is reused or evaporated. Tailings dams can be toxic due to the presence of unextracted sulfide minerals, some forms of toxic minerals in the gangue, and often cyanide which is used to treat gold ore via the cyanide leach process. If proper environmental protections are not in place, this toxicity can harm the surrounding environment.

Pollutants
Open-pit mining involves the process of disrupting the ground, which leads to the creation of air pollutants. The main source of air pollutants comes from the transportation of minerals, but there are various other factors including drilling, blasting and the loading and unloading of overburden. These type of pollutants cause significant damage to public health and safety in addition to damaging the air quality. The inhalation of these pollutants can cause issues to the lungs and ultimately increase mortality. Furthermore, the pollutants affect flora and fauna in the areas surrounding open-pit mines.

Open-pit gold mining is one of the highest potential mining threats on the environment as it affects the air and water chemistry. The exposed dust may be toxic or radioactive, making it a health concern for the workers and the surrounding communities.

Hydrology in mining
Open pit mines operating in an area with heavy groundwater features may eventually face hydrology-related problems. This includes heaving and bursting of the mine floor due to excessive uplift pressure. A groundwater control system must be installed to fix problems caused by hydrology. The formation of an appropriate open pit slope design, changes throughout the life of a mine. It is based mainly on an ever increasing understanding of the rock mass conditions. Which includes groundwater and associated pressures that may be acting within the slopes. The reduction of groundwater related to pore pressures is a crucial aspect of determining whether or not a geotechnical engineering design for open pit slopes is attainable. Groundwater control systems, which include dewatering and depressurization wells, may also have a large impact on local groundwater. Because of this, an optimization-based version of the control system is required to ensure that local and regional hydro-geological impacts are within acceptable ranges.

Open Pit Depressurization is the process of removing tensions or pressure from different areas of a mine. Depressurization helps to make open pit mines more stable and secure. By using an integrated mine slope depressurization program the likelihood that mine plans can be achieved, and at an acceptable level of risk increase drastically. Depressurization allows considerable expansions of a mine, and can extend the life of the mine by 10 to 15 years. One technique used in depressurization is annealing. Annealing is the slow heating and cooling of a metal, alloy or glass. This slow heating and cooling relieves the internal stress of surrounding areas. Annealing will increase a material's workability and durability, which overall increases open pit mine safety. When groundwater pressures cause problems in open pit mines,  horizontal drains are used to aid in accelerating the slope depressurization process. Which helps to prevent large scale slope failure in the mine. Horizontal drains are used to lower pore pressure by reducing groundwater head, which enhances slope stability.

Untopping
A form of open-cast quarrying may be carried out as 'untopping'. This is done where a previous underground mine is becoming uneconomic or worked-out, but still leaves valuable rock in place, often as a result of room and pillar mining. Untopping removes the overburden from above this, opens up the mine from above, and then allows the previously 'trapped' minerals to be won.

Untopping was a feature of Welsh slate workings in the 1930s and 2000s, where Martyn Williams-Ellis, manager at Llechwedd found that earlier Victorian workings could be kept profitable with the newly mechanised techniques for bulk excavation to extract their pillars, and more recently across a number of worked-out mines.

Rehabilitation

After mining finishes, the mine area may undergo land rehabilitation. Waste dumps are contoured to flatten them out, to further stabilize them. If the ore contains sulfides it is usually covered with a layer of clay to prevent access of rain and oxygen from the air, which can oxidize the sulfides to produce sulfuric acid, a phenomenon known as acid mine drainage. This is then generally covered with soil, and vegetation is planted to help consolidate the material. Eventually this layer will erode, but it is generally hoped that the rate of leaching or acid will be slowed by the cover such that the environment can handle the load of acid and associated heavy metals. There are no long term studies on the success of these covers due to the relatively short time in which large scale open pit mining has existed. It may take hundreds to thousands of years for some waste dumps to become "acid neutral" and stop leaching to the environment. The dumps are usually fenced off to prevent livestock denuding them of vegetation. The open pit is then surrounded with a fence, to prevent access, and it generally eventually fills up with ground water. In arid areas it may not fill due to deep groundwater levels. Instead of returning the land to its former natural state, it may also be reused, converting it into recreational parks or even residential/mixed communities. In Germany, the world's largest producer of lignite (virtually all of which is mined open pit these days), the former mines are usually converted to artificial lakes. To mitigate the problem of acid mine drainage mentioned above, flooding is often done with the water of nearby rivers instead of using groundwater alone. In some cases Calcium Oxide or other basic chemicals have to be added to the water to neutralize the pH-value.

Typical open cut grades
Gold is generally extracted in open-pit mines at 1 to 5 ppm (parts per million) but in certain cases, 0.75 ppm gold is economical. This was achieved by bulk heap leaching at the Peak Hill mine in western New South Wales, near Dubbo, Australia.

Nickel, generally as laterite, is extracted via open-pit down to 0.2%. Copper can be extracted at grades as low as 0.11% to 0.2%.

Materials typically extracted from open-pit mines include:

Bitumen
Clay
Coal
Copper
Coquina
Chromite
Diamonds
Gravel and stone 
Granite
Gritstone
Gypsum
Limestone
Marble
Metal ores, such as copper, iron, gold, silver and molybdenum
Phosphate
Uranium

Largest open pit mines
Open pit mining is a common method to extract minerals and samples from the Earth. Due to being cost effective, this method is very popular and is used all over the world. Listed are the world's ten largest open pit mines.

1. Bingham Canyon Mine - Utah
2. Mir Mine - Eastern Siberia, Russia
3. Super Pit Gold Mine - Australia
4. Big Hole - South Africa
5. Diavik Diamond Mine - Canada
6. Hull–Rust–Mahoning Open Pit Iron Mine - Minnesota
7. Grasberg Mine - Indonesia
8. Chuquicamata - Chile
9. Udachnaya Pipe - Siberia, Russia
10. Escondida - Chile

See also

 
 Rheinisches Braunkohlerevier
  applied to open-pit mines for optimal extraction (not related to closing the mine)

References

External links

 The biggest, deepest and deadliest mines in the world
 Deepest open pit mines

Open-pit mines
Surface mining